Two vessels of the Royal Navy have been named HMS Mignonette:

, an  sloop launched on 26 January 1916 and sunk by a mine on 17 March 1917.
, a  launched on 28 January 1941 and sold in 1946.

See also

Sources

Royal Navy ship names